The third season of Sin senos sí hay paraíso, a Colombian-American television series created by Gustavo Bolívar, that premiered on Telemundo on 12 June 2018 and concluded on 10 September 2018. 

The start of production of the third season was confirmed from November 2017, and concluded on 19 April 2018.

Premise 
The season begins with the expected results of the departmental beauty contest of Colombia, and revolves around the doubts that remained in the previous season, about the curse that persecutes the daughters of "Las Chicas del Barrio", the spell of Albeiro (Fabián Ríos) and the confusion of Catalina, La Grande (Carmen Villalobos), for her love for El Titi (Gregorio Pernía) and Albeiro. As well as the conflict between Hernán Darío (Juan Pablo Urrego), and Catalina, La Pequeña (Carolina Gaitán) about Mariana's pregnancy, and the return of Martín (Juan Alfonso Baptista), who has returned to take revenge on Catalina, La Grande for having handed him over to the authorities.

Synopsis 
The time has come to choose the most beautiful girl in the region. The catwalk has become a battlefield. The support of the Marín family towards Catalina La Pequeña (Carolina Gaitán) and Yésica Beltrán (Majida Issa) towards her daughter is immense as she is willing to do anything to see her daughter Daniela (Johanna Fadul) crowned as queen of the region. Yésica, who attends the event disguised as her sister, Amparo, has come in contact with the juries and seeks to bribe them to tilt their vote in favor of Daniela. But Catalina La Pequeña stands out not only for her beauty, but for her intelligence. The result of this contest will define the course of their lives. Catalina La Pequeña's and Hernán Darío's relationship (Juan Pablo Urrego) is threatened by Mariana's obsession. She will give birth to a beautiful girl and continue to claim that she is the daughter of Hernán Darío. Catalina La Pequeña doubt of the paternity of Hernán Darío and will do everything in his power to decipher the identity of the true father. It will not be an easy battle and Mariana will do everything possible to snatch the love of her life to Catalina La Pequeña.

On the other hand, the fearsome curse of the witch Abigail materializes. Catalina La Grande (Carmen Villalobos) and her friends know that their daughters are in danger. Adriana, Vanessa's daughter died, as did Martina, Paola's daughter, and now Catalina La Grande will have to redouble her efforts to take care of Mariana, while Ximena will take care of the steps of her daughter, Valentina. In this battle against evil they will have many allies but there is no lack of enemies.

Cast

Main 
 Carmen Villalobos as Catalina Santana
 Catherine Siachoque as Hilda Santana
 Fabián Ríos as Albeiro Marín
 Majida Issa as Yésica Beltrán
 Carolina Gaitán as Catalina Marín
 Roberto Manrique as Santiago Sanín
 Gregorio Pernía as Aurelio Jaramillo
 Javier Jattin as Tony Campana
 Juan Pablo Urrego as Hernán Darío
 Francisco Bolívar as José Luis Vargas
 Juan Alfonso Baptista as Martín Cruz

Recurring 
 Estefanía Gómez as Vanessa Salazar
 Mauricio Mejía as Carlos
 Marilyn Patiño as Lucía Barrios
 Jennifer Arenas as Valentina Fonseca
 Stephania Duque as Mariana Sanín
 Johan Esteban Díaz as Sebastián Sanín
 Manuel Antonio Gómez as Esteban Calvo
 Elianis Garrido as Dayana Muriel
 Carolina Sepúlveda as Ximena Fonseca
 María Alejandra Pinzón as Paola Pizarro
 Andrea Pita as Laura
 Patricia Maldonado as Abigail
 Luis Fernando Bohórquez as Coronel Granados
 Emilia Ceballos as Yamile
 Rubén Arciniegas as El Chalo
 Ricardo Henao as Gabriel
 Alejandra Monsalve as Sandra
 Milena Granados as Margarita

Special guest stars 
 Dennis Fernando as Himself
 Juan Angel Esparza as Carmelo Villa
 Juan Pablo Llano as Daniel Cerón
 Eileen Roca as Zoraya
 Johanna Fadul as Daniela Barrera

Episodes

References 

Sin senos sí hay paraíso
2018 American television seasons